Nao Klao (Naogelao) or Baonao is a Hmongic language of southern China.

Varieties
According to Meng (2001), Baonao 包瑙 (Nao Klao, Naogelao 瑙格劳,) has 28,952 speakers in Nandan, Hechi, and Tian'e in Guangxi as well as Libo County, Guizhou. The representative dialect in Meng (2001) is that of Lihu Township 里湖瑶族乡, Nandan County 南丹县, Guangxi.

Beidongnuo 被动诺, with 244 speakers (as of 1984) in Libo County, Guizhou, is likely a variety of Nagelao (Nao Klao). It was identified as Dongmeng by Bradley (2007).

References

West Hmongic languages
Languages of China